Omenana Magazine is a speculative fiction online magazine that publishes stories by writers from Africa and the African diaspora. It is edited and published by Fred Chiagozie Nwonwu. It was founded in 2014 by Fred Chiagozie Nwonwu and Chinelo Onwualu.

The magazine publishes original works by authors such as Tochi Onyebuchi Oghenechovwe Donald Ekpeki, Ayodele Olofintuade, Chikodili Emelumadu and Tendai Huchu.

The magazine published nine issues within three years.

References

External links
Official website

Science fiction webzines
Magazines established in 2014
Fantasy fiction magazines
Online magazines published in Nigeria
Afrofuturism
Africanfuturism